Ulaangom is the capital of Uvs Province in Mongolia.

Description 
The city has a population of 30,688 (2016 census), 26,319 (2000 census), 23,000 (2006 est.), 22,300 (end of 2008 est.) or 37.8% of the total population of Uvs aimag. It is divided into two suburban areas named Chandmani and Uliasny Khev.

A Consulate of Tuva Republic of Russia is located in Ulaangom, and a Representative Office of Uvs Province in Kyzyl, the capital of Tuva.

History 
Ulaangom is believed to have been founded in 1686. The foundation of the Ulaangom Monastery was erected in 1871 as Dechinravjaa Monastery. Historical evidence indicates that there were grain plantations in operation in late 17th century in the area of Ulaangom.

Climate
Ulaangom experiences a cold arid climate (Köppen BWk) with long, dry, frigid winters and short, warm summers. Owing to its location in a deep valley near the center of the Siberian High, Ulaangom is subject to temperature inversions reaching up to  colder than middle and upper mountain slopes. It is thus one of the coldest places in Mongolia despite lying at a lower altitude than most of the country.

Culture 
The city has monuments from the communist era, such as a monument of Yumjaagiin Tsedenbal, who was born in Uvs aimag and led the country for more than 40 years, in front of the Provincial Government Building. There are many educational and cultural organizations and institutions in the city. There is a branch of a university, a vocational college and 5 secondary schools.

Transportation 
Ulaangom is connected to the Russian border by highway, and imports its electricity from the Russian Federation. The old airport  is no longer in service. New Ulaangom Airport is called Deglii Tsagaan and it is situated north of the city. The new runway and terminal were completed in June 2011 and the first jetliner of Eznis Airways landed on June 26, 2011 from Ulaanbaatar. As of May 2017, Hunnu Air was the only airline that had regular scheduled flight from Ulaanbaatar.

Notable natives
 Norovyn Altankhuyag, 25th Prime Minister of Mongolia

References

Populated places established in 1686
Aimag centers
1686 establishments in Asia
Districts of Uvs Province